The 2003 Clásica de San Sebastián was the 23rd edition of the Clásica de San Sebastián cycle race and was held on 9 August 2003. The race started and finished in San Sebastián. The race was won by Paolo Bettini of the Quick-Step team.

General classification

References

Clásica de San Sebastián
San
Clasica de San Sebastian
August 2003 sports events in Europe